Odostomia engbergi is a species of sea snail, a marine gastropod mollusc in the family Pyramidellidae, the pyrams and their allies.

This species was named for Dr. Carl C. Engberg.

Distribution
This marine species occurs in the Pacific Ocean off San Juan Island, Puget Sound, State of Washington, USA.

References

External links
 To World Register of Marine Species

engbergi
Gastropods described in 1920